David Leander Stine (January 4, 1857 – August 3, 1941) was an architect in Toledo, Ohio. His work includes the Brumback Library, Lucas County Courthouse and Jail (1897) and several homes in the Old West End neighborhood of Toledo including the Edward D. Libbey House (1895) (Toledo Society for the Handicapped).

Work
 Lucas County Courthouse and Jail (1897)
 Brumback Library

Old West End
 Edward D. Libbey House (1895), a National Landmark
 Ashland Baptist Church at 2001 Ashland
 Julius Lamon House at 2056 Scottwood
 George Allen House 2238 Scottwood
 John Barber House at 2271 Scottwood
 Frank Zahm House at 2345 Collingwood
 James Robinson House at 2104 Parkwood
 Coldham House at 2243 Robinwood

References

Further reading
David L. and Sidney L. Stine Collection; Scope and Contents Note Local History & Genealogy Department Toledo-Lucas County Public Library, Toledo, Ohio

Architects from Toledo, Ohio
Artists from Toledo, Ohio
1941 deaths
1857 births